Randers Sportsklub Freja (often abbreviated Randers Freja) is a Danish sport club with teams in athletics, handball, table tennis and football.

History 

Randers Freja was founded in 1898, and was accepted into the JBU in 1907.

The football department, under the name Randers Freja FC, was established in the late 1990s. In 2003, it merged with five other local football clubs to form Randers FC. The club's football department still exists, but is now considered the reserve team for Randers FC.

The handball department became part of Randers HK in 1996.

Colours 

As Randers FC's reserves, Randers Freja's colour is light blue; however, the club's original colours are white and blue.

Stadium 

Randers Freja play their home matches at Essex Park Randers.

Current squad 
See Randers FC.

Honours
Danish Cup
Winners (3) : 1966–67, 1967–68, 1972–73
UEFA Cup Winners Cup
Quarter-finalists (1): 1968–69

References

External links 
 Randers Freja – official site
 Randers FC – official site

Football clubs in Denmark
Athletics clubs in Denmark
Association football clubs established in 1898
Multi-sport clubs in Denmark
1898 establishments in Denmark